Kastanochori ( meaning "chestnut village", before 1928: Κραμποβός - Krampovos) is a village in the municipality of Megalopoli, Arcadia, Greece. It is situated in the southeastern foothills of mount Lykaion, at about 750 m elevation. It is 2 km east of Lykaio, 3 km southwest of Isoma Karyon and 10 km west of Megalopoli. In 2011 Kastanochori had a population of 94.

Population

See also
List of settlements in Arcadia

References

External links
History and information about Kastanochori
 Kastanochori on the GTP Travel Pages

Megalopolis, Greece
Populated places in Arcadia, Peloponnese